La Sexta ("The Sixth"; stylized as laSexta) is a Spanish free-to-air television channel. It is privately owned and was originally founded on 18 March 2001 as Beca TV that began broadcasting on 1 April 2001, that same year. By 21 July 2003, the channel ran into liquidation and was closed down, but two years later in 2005, it was replaced by a new channel called La Sexta that began test transmissions on 25 November 2005, and a year later, it started broadcasting officially on 27 March 2006. The channel's programming is generalist, however, there is an emphasis on humour and entertainment. The channel is also known for its large quantity of American and sports programming, and in the last years, it's becoming more and more acknowledged due to the wide covering of political events, such as elections, which include extensive debate through 3 key programmes: Al rojo vivo (Red-hot), El objetivo (The lens) and Salvados (Saved). The political alignment of its news and debate programs is left wing.

In 2012 the channel was acquired by Grupo Antena 3, currently named Atresmedia Televisión.

Programming

LaSexta's programming from Monday to Friday is mainly based on information and debate spaces, although more general programming such as movies, reality shows or reporting programs are broadcast at night. During the weekend, the channel reduces its news and debate programs to broadcast reruns of previous programs or movies.

Some original programming of LaSexta includes BuenAgente, El Intermedio, El jefe infiltrado, Pesadilla en la cocina, Qué vida más triste, The Refugees, Salvados, Sé lo que hicisteis..., SMS: Sin Miedo a Soñar, and Zapeando.

Other programming also includes Emma's Theatre, My Name Is Earl, The Office, Law & Order, World of Polli, The Sopranos, NCIS, The King of Queens, Monsuno, Entourage, Pierre the Painter, How I Met Your Mother, Family Guy, Futurama, Bones, 30 Rock, Arthur's Missing Pal, The Mentalist, Eleventh Hour, Do As I Do, Prison Break and The Walking Dead.

Production
La Sexta currently broadcasts in 16:9 for most programming although they still use 4:3 for a minority of programming including films and older series.

Logos

History
La Sexta was first founded as a TV production company on 25 November 2005 when it got its broadcast license. It began testing the broadcast on 12 December, shortly before knowing the analog frequencies assigned to Madrid and Barcelona.

On 23 December, broadcasts started in Madrid and Barcelona, expanding later to all Spain.

Starting 23 January 2006 they began broadcasting a promotional video. 20 February marked the start of content emissions testing. Actual broadcasts started with documentaries (Champions, Natura) and programs dedicated to tuning, like 'Tuning Mania'. From 22 February, La Sexta broadcast twelve hours of programming every day.

On 2 March, a football match between Croatia and Argentina was the occasion for the first live broadcast. Five days before the actual date, José Miguel Contreras announced the official starting date, 27 March, on the Círculo de Bellas Artes.

References

External links
Official site 
La Sexta at LyngSat Address

 
Television stations in Spain
Television channels and stations established in 2001
Television channels and stations disestablished in 2003
Television channels and stations established in 2005
Television channels and stations established in 2006
Spanish companies established in 2005
Spanish companies established in 2006
Spanish-language television stations
Atresmedia channels